Sadaung is a common town name in the Sagaing Region and the Mandalay Region of Burma (Myanmar).  It may refer to:

 Mandalay Region
 Sadaung, Natogyi Township, Myingyan District 
 Sadaung, Pyawbwe Township, Yamethin District
Sagaing Region
 Sadaung, Sagaing Township, Sagaing District
 Sadaung I, Wetlet Township, Shwebo District
 Sadaung II, Wetlet Township, Shwebo District